Var Kola (also Romanized as Var Kolā and Var Kalā; also known as Var Kūlā) is a village in Gahrbaran-e Jonubi Rural District, Gahrbaran District, Miandorud County, Mazandaran Province, Iran. At the 2006 census, its population was 478, in 126 families.

References 

Populated places in Miandorud County